The Walnut Street Historic District is a historic district which was listed on the National Register of Historic Places in 1989.

The  listed area included 36 contributing buildings.

One of the more important properties is the John Thompson House/Bainbridge Tavern, which served as a tavern operated from 1817 to 1830 by John W. Bainbridge. It is a two-story three-bay log building; it may have been built as a hall/parlor plan house originally.  It has a massive brick chimney and very old beaded weatherboarding.

References

Historic districts on the National Register of Historic Places in Kentucky
Federal architecture in Kentucky
Victorian architecture in Kentucky
National Register of Historic Places in Washington County, Kentucky
Buildings and structures in Springfield, Kentucky